is a Japanese voice actress, singer and narrator. She has been part of the singing groups DoCo and Goddess Family Club. She is the founder and manager of her voice-acting company, Office Anemone. Inoue tends to play the "perfect girlfriend" or "motherly" role in many series, but has also played more sultry and provocative roles.

Biography
Inoue's vocal roles are usually female characters characterized as dignified, reserved, beautiful, kind, regal, mature or domestic. For example, Belldandy, a goddess who is kind, compassionate and skilled at domestic tasks. Kasumi Tendo is an older sister who has taken over domestic duties after the death of her mother, and who acts as a counterbalance to the more rambunctious members of her family. Notably, both Kasumi and Belldandy are almost parallels of each other due to their roles as domestics in a home which could explode into chaos at any moment. She also plays Rune Venus in El-Hazard, a princess and leader of her country; as well as Kazami Mizuho in Please Teacher!, a sensible, strong-hearted alien agent in charge of observing humanity that ends up falling in love with an earthling. In the video game Danganronpa V3: Killing Harmony, she voices as Kirumi Tojo aka "The Ultimate Maid" A loyal and serious Ultimate who takes care of both chores and the students during the Killing School Semester, who goes by the saying "duty before self"; This role also exposes Kikuko's love of maids. When she thinks of maid characters, she always tend to imagine them as a lighthearted one, but Kirumi is definitely the type of an amazing perfectionist whose only cred is "selfless devotion." Inoue also said that she can be a little bit nervous playing as Kirumi in the official Artbook Character Profile. And on May 12, 2020, Kikuko cosplayed as Kirumi for Maid Day.

She occasionally takes on roles which are more sultry, such as Corvette in Idol Project, a curvaceous dancer who flirts quite intensely with Mimu, the young heroine. In the hentai OVA Ogenki Clinic she provides the voice of a sex-crazed nurse. Also, as Lust in Fullmetal Alchemist: Brotherhood, she was an antagonist the main characters have to contend with more than once. On very rare occasions she takes male roles, such as Tsubasa Oozora from Captain Tsubasa ROAD to 2002, as she has stated that these roles allow her to shout, which she finds "liberating".

She is referred to as "Onee-chan" ("big sister" in Japanese) and stayed with the title on her official site and a few albums because of her role as Kasumi Tendo in Ranma ½; this is confirmed in her online profile. She believes that in her past life she was a fish and therefore uses fish as her trademark. She made a guest appearance at the 2007 Animazement anime convention in Durham, North Carolina for an autograph and Q&A session. When asked her age, she often responds that she is only 17, which has become a running gag at events as well as anime shows. At an Otakon 2009 panel, she explained that the number 17 was an aesthetic choice. After voice acting Belldandy from the Ah! My Goddess anime, subsequent chapters of the manga used Inoue's distinctive style as the basis for Belldandy's character.

She won Best Supporting Voice Actress in the 4th Seiyu Awards. In 2016, at the 10th Seiyu Awards, she won the Kazue Takahashi Award for "the female performer who broadens the profession of voice acting in every form of media."

Inoue is married, and has a daughter named Honoka. Honoka uses Inoue as her stage "family" name and she is also a voice actress and singer. Kikuko Inoue is best friends with fellow voice actress Atsuko Tanaka.

Filmography

Animation

Film

Video games
{| class="wikitable sortable plainrowheaders"
|+ List of voice performances in video games
! Year
! Title
! Role
! class="unsortable"| Notes
! class="unsortable"| Source
|-
| –1996 || Ranma ½ games || Kasumi Tendo || || 
|-
|  || Lunar: The Silver Star || Luna Noah, Alex Noah || || 
|-
|  || Detonator Orgun || Akitaka Miyabi ||  || 
|-
|  || Night Trap || Kelly || || 
|-
|  || Dragon Half || Mana || ||  
|-
| –1996 || Megami Paradise || Stashia || Also II || 
|-
|  || TwinBee Taisen Puzzle Dama || Princess Melora || PS1/PS2 || 
|-
|  || Lunar Eternal Blue || Luna, Althena ||  || 
|-
|  || Mystaria: The Realms of Lore || Anju || || 
|-
| –1996 || Policenauts || Karen Hōjō ||  || 
|-
| –1997 || Dokyusei series || Yoshiko Serizawa ||  || 
|-
|  || Dragon Force || Astea || SS || 
|-
|  || PoPoLoCrois Monogatari || Narrator  || PS1/PS2 || 
|-
|  || El-Hazard || Rune Venus || SS || 
|-
|  || Langrisser III || Lushiris, Varna || SS || 
|-
|  || Puyo Puyo CD 2 || Will-o-wisp, Trio the Banshee || TG-SCD || 
|-
|  || Fist || Maria Kristelマリア・クリステル || PS1/PS2 || 
|-
| –1997 || True Love Story || Saeko Mikami || PS1/PS2Also Remember My Heart || 
|-
|  || Imadoki no Vampire: Bloody Bride || Anna Makimura牧村杏奈 || PS1/PS2 || 
|-
|  || Tengai Makyō: Daiyon no Mokushiroku || Delacroixドラクロワ || Also 2006 || 
|-
|  || Saber Marionette J: Battle Sabres || Panther || PS1/PS2 || 
|-
| –1998 || Eternal Fantasy || Alisa Astirアリサ・アスティア || || 
|-
|  || Ayakashi Ninden Kunoichiban || Miyuki Tōno || PS1/PS2 || 
|-
|  || YU-NO: A girl who chants love at the bound of this world || Ayumi Arima || SS || 
|-
| –1998 || Galaxy Fräulein Yuna games || Maboroshiyume幻夢 || SS || 
|-
| –2007 || Ah! My Goddess games || Belldandy ||  || 
|-
| –1998 || Grandia || Liete ||  || 
|-
| –2011 || Tales games ||  Philia Felice || Starting with Destiny || 
|-
|  || Mitsumete Knight || Claire Majoram || PS1/PS2 || 
|-
|  || Twinbee RPG || Fortune-teller, Princess Melora || PS1/PS2 || 
|-
|  || Black/Matrix ||  RupiRupi || || 
|-
|  || Princess Quest || Panna cottaパンナコッタ || SS || 
|-
|  || Eretzvaju || Ihadurca Il Imella, Karin, Lea || PS1 ||
|-
|  || Legend of Himiko || Io 夷緒 || PS1/PS2 || 
|-
|  || Gate Keepers || Jun Sandersジュン・サンダース || PS1/PS2 || 
|-
| , 2006 || Valkyrie Profile games || Riseria, Aari, Asaka || PS1/PS2 || 
|-
|  || Phantom of Inferno || Claudia McCunnen || || 
|-
|  || Salaryman Kintaro: The Game || Misuzu Suenaga末永美鈴 || PS1/PS2 || 
|-
|  || Blood: The Last Vampire || Akariko灯子 || PS1/PS2 || 
|-
| –2003 || Never 7: The End of Infinity || Izumi Morino || DC || 
|-
| –05 || Sakura Wars games || Lobelia Carlini ||  || 
|-
|  || Segagaga || Alex Kidd, Kaorin Nijino, Secretary Arisa, BUG Otorii manager  || DC || 
|-
|  || Armored Core 2: Another Age || Operator || PS1/PS2 || 
|-
|  || Happy Lesson || Yayoi Sanzein || DC || 
|-
|  || Galaxy Express 999 || Haguro Mystic羽黒妖 || PS1/PS2 || 
|-
| –2007 || Everybody's Golf series || Gloria || PS1/PS2 || 
|-
|  || Metal Gear Solid 2: Sons of Liberty || Rosemary || || 
|-
|  || Prism Heart || Freyaフレイア || DC || 
|-
|  || Inuyasha || Mu-on'na || PlayStation ||
|-
|  || Guilty Gear XX || I-No || Arcade/PS2 || 
|-
|  || Hourglass of Summer || Tomomi Yanagihara || PS1/PS2 || 
|-
| –2004 || Gungrave || Maria Asagi || Also O.D. in 2004 || 
|-
|  || Mobile Suit Gundam: Lost War Chronicles || Aina Sakhalinアイナ・サハリン || PS1/PS2 || 
|-
|  || Air || Uraha裏葉 || PS1/PS2Also 2007 || 
|-
|  || Galaxy Angel || Shatoyan ||  || 
|-
|  || Braveknight: Lieveland Eiyuuden || Remilia Arfolgレミリア＝アーフォルグ || Xbox || 
|-
|  ||  Unlimited Saga || Marie, Laura || || 
|-
|  || Unlimited Saga || Roller / Marieローラ／マリー || PS1/PS2 || 
|-
|  ||  Tenchu: Wrath of Heaven || Kagura || || 
|-
|  || Yumeria || Nanase Senjō || PS1/PS2 || 
|-
|  || Chobits: Chi Only Human || Chitose Hibiya || PS1/PS2 || 
|-
|  || Phantom of Inferno || Crow Deer Makkyenenクロウディア・マッキェネン || PS1/PS2 || 
|-
|  || Cyber Troopers Virtual-On Marz || Tangramタングラム || PS1/PS2 || 
|-
|  || DearS || Mitsuka Yoshimine  || PS1/PS2 || 
|-
|  ||  Metal Gear Solid 3: Snake Eater || The Boss || || 
|-
|  || Train Man || Hermesエルメス ||  || 
|-
|  || Namco × Capcom || Valkyrie, Black Valkyrie || PS1/PS2 || 
|-
|  || Rogue Galaxy || Lilika Rhyza || PS1/PS2 || 
|-
|  || Baten Kaitos II || Valara ||  || 
|-
|  || My-Hime games || Sanada Murasakiko真田紫子 || PSP || 
|-
| , 2014 || Clannad || Sanae Furukawa || PS1/PS2 || 
|-
|  || Black Cat || Sephiria Arks || PS1/PS2 || 
|-
|  || Everybody's Tennis || Gloria || PS1/PS2 || 
|-
| –2010 || Higurashi When They Cry games || Akane Sonozaki || PS1/PS2 || 
|-
| –2015 || Quiz Magic Academy series || Eliza || Starting from 5 || 
|-
|  || Code Geass: Lelouch of the Rebellion Lost Colors || Cécile Croomy ||  || 
|-
|  || Metal Gear Solid 4: Guns of the Patriots || Rosemary, Sunny || PS3 || 
|-
|  || The Familiar of Zero || Eleanor || PS1/PS2 || 
|-
|  || Shining Force Feather || Gurizeriaグリゼリア || DS || 
|-
|  || Extravaganza of Rosario + Vampire CAPU2 love with a dream || Cat eyes static猫目静 || PS1/PS2 || 
|-
|  || Macross Ultimate Frontier || Grace O'Connor || PSP || 
|-
| –2010 || Fullmetal Alchemist: Brotherhood games || Lust  || PSP || 
|-
|  || Everybody's Tennis Portable || Gloriaグロリア || PSP || 
|-
|  || Ikki Tousen: Xross Impact || Goei || PSP || 
|-
|  || Metal Gear Solid: Peace Walker || Chico, The Boss, The Boss AI || PSP || 
|-
|  || Another Century's Episode: R || Cécile Croomy, Grace O'Connor || PS3 || 
|-
|  || Castlevania: Lords of Shadow || Marieマリー || || 
|-
| –2011 || Umineko When They Cry || Virgilia || PS3 || 
|-
|  || Macross Triangle Frontier || Grace O'Connor || PSP || 
|-
|  || Rune Factory: Tides of Destiny || Lily ||  || 
|-
|  ||  Grand Knights History ||  Queen Muse || || 
|-
|  || Dragon Age II || Leandra || || 
|-
|  || Genso Suikoden: Tsumugareshi Hyakunen no Toki || Astridアストリッド || PSP || 
|-
| –2014 || Robotics;Notes ||  Misaki Senomiya || Also Elite || 
|-
|  || Project X Zone || Valkyrie || 3DS || 
|-
|  || Metal Gear Rising: Revengeance || Sunny || PS3 || 
|-
| –2014 || Super Robot Wars series || Tyutti Norback, Cecile Croomy || PS1/PS2 || 
|-
|  || God Eater 2 || Dr. Leah Claudius || || 
|-
| –2015 || Arcana Famiglia 2 || Sumire || PSP || 
|-
|  || Guilty Gear Xrd -SIGN- || I-No || Arcade/PC/PS3/PS4Also -REVELATOR- || 
|-
|  || Metal Gear Solid V: Ground Zeroes || Chico || || 
|-
|  || Crayon Shin-chan Arashi o Yobu Kasukabe Eiga Stars! || Siren || 3DS || 
|-
|  || Sonic & All-Stars Racing Transformed || Alex Kiddアレックスキッド || PS3, Wii U || 
|-
|  || Chaos Rings III || Mariaivuマリアイヴ ||  || 
|-
| –2016 || Senran Kagura Estival Versus || Ryoki ||  || 
|-
|  || Metal Gear Solid V: The Phantom Pain || The Boss AI || || 
|-
|  || Project X Zone 2: Brave New World || Valkyrie || 3DS || 
|-
|  || Omega Labyrinth || Yumi Amano ||  || 
|-
|  || Exist Archive || Amatsumeアマツメ ||  || 
|-
|  || Root Letter || Yukari Ishihara || || 
|-
|  || Danganronpa V3: Killing Harmony || Kirumi Tōjō || || 
|-
|  || Fire Emblem Heroes || Rhea || iOS, Android || 
|-
|
|Fate/Grand Order|Caster of Nightless City/Scheherazade
|iOS, Android
|
|-
|2018
|Sdorica|Lisa Ortiz Aguilar, Lisa SP
|iOS, Android
|
|-
|  || Crystar || Anamnesis || PC/PS4 || 
|-
|  || Our World is Ended || Erorie Nyunyu || PC/PS4/Nintendo Switch || 
|-
|  || Fire Emblem: Three Houses || Rhea || Nintendo Switch ||
|-
|  || Death Stranding || Amelie || PS4 || 
|-
|  || Nioh 2 || Miyoshino || ||
|-
|2020
|Genshin Impact|Alice
|
|
|-
|  || Resident Evil Village || Alcina Dimitrescu || || 
|-
|  || Guilty Gear -STRIVE- || I-No || PC/PS4/PS5 || 
|-
|  || The King of Fighters All Star || I-No || iOS, Android || 
|-
|  || Final Fantasy XIV: Endwalker || Venat / Hydaelyn || PC/PS4/PS5/macOS ||
|-
|  || Arknights || Ling || iOS, Android || 
|-
|  || The Legend of Heroes: Kuro no Kiseki II – Crimson Sin || Latoya Hamilton || PS4/PS5 || 
|-
|  || Monochrome Mobius: Rights and Wrongs Forgotten || Shantuura || PC/PS4/PS5 || 
|}

Drama CDs

Tokusatsu

Dubbing

Live appearances
 TV Champion (TV Tokyo, September 15, 2005)

Stage appearances
 Densha Otoko (Erumesu)
 Sakura Taisen Paris Mini-Live 2001 Tokyo (Lobelia Carlini)
 Sakura Taisen Paris no Christmas, Joyeux Noël! 2001 Dinner Show, Tokyo (Lobelia Carlini)

Discography

Albums

 Bokura no Best da, Onee-chan Funwari, Nobi Nobi Perfect Solo Collection (LD + 2-CD set)
 Fushigi na Omajinai: Tadaima 2 Hidamari merry fish: sound & photo book Mizuumi 
 Shiawase Tambourine Sora Iro no Ehon (2-CD set)
 Tadaima Tanoshii Koto Yūbi na Osakana Outside Japan
 Anime Toonz Presents Kikuko Inoue (Jellybean, 2001)

Singles
 Dōzo Yoroshiku ne. OkaerinasaiTalk
 Inoue Kikuko no Gekkan Onee-chan to Issho monthly series (1997)
 Manbow Hōsōkyoku
 Ruri Iro Aquarium: Manbow Hōsōkyoku 2
 Ruri Iro Aquarium Special: Manbow Hōsōkyoku 3
 Ruri Iro Aquarium Selection
 Shin Onee-chan to Issho seasonal series (1999)

Collaboration
 Lu · puty · La · puty (Shiawase Kurowassan, Kikuko Inoue and Maria Yamamoto)
 Osakana Penguin no Theme (Osakana Penguin, Kikuko Inoue and Junko Iwao)
 Osakana Penguin CD (Osakana Penguin, Kikuko Inoue and Junko Iwao)
 Shiawase-san (Shiawase Kurowassan, Kikuko Inoue and Maria Yamamoto)

Soundtracks

 Anata no Birthday (as Belldandy)
 Aria Drama CD I (Alicia Florence and Hime M. Granchester from Aria)
 Aria Drama CD II (Alicia Florence and Hime M. Granchester from Aria)
 E-yume, Miyou! (Meimi and Seira from Saint Tail)
 Gimme Love (from Voogie's Angel)
 Girl Friends (from Voogie's Angel)
 Oh My Goddess! Mikami Debut Pack (as Belldandy from Oh My Goddess!)
 Shin Megami Tensei Devil Children Character File 3 (as Cool from Shin Megami Tensei Devil Children)

Radio
Listed in broadcast order.

AM radio

 Inoue Kikuko no Twilight Syndrome (April–September 1995)
 Inoue Kikuko no Ruri Iro Aquarium (October 1995–March 1996)
 Kakikuke Kikuko no Sashisuse Sonata (October 1998–March 1999)
 Hexamoon Guardians  Kikuko Maria no Otsuki-sama ni Onegai (April 1999–March 2000)
 It's on! (October 2001–March 2003)
 Onegai Teacher: Mizuho-sensei no Hachimitsu Jugyō (January–October 2002)
 Inoue Kikuko no Caramel Heights (October 2002–March 2005)
 Onegai Teacher: Hachimitsu Jugyō♥Ho · Shu · U (October 2002–March 2003)
 Onegai Teacher: Hachimitsu Jugyō Shingakki (April–June 2003)
 Onegai Twins: Mizuho-sensei to Hachimitsu Twins (July 2003–March 2004)
 Hāi Inoue Shōten Desu yo! (April 2005–current)

Satellite digital radio
 Inoue Kikuko no Osakana Radio (November 2000–March 2002)
 Inoue Kikuko no Shiitake Radio (April 2002–March 2003)
 Inoue Kikuko no Caramel Town (March 2003–current)

Internet radio
 Onegai Hour: Mizuho-sensei no Kojin Jugyō (May 2004–March 2005)
 Onee-chan ha Mahō Shōjo? (June 2005–current)

Other products
 Coco Macne (white) and Coco Macne (black) from the Macne series.
 Haruno Sora'', a Vocaloid for VOCALOID 5.

Awards

References

External links
  
 Official agency profile 
 
 
 

1964 births
Living people
Japanese video game actresses
Japanese voice actresses
Musicians from Kanagawa Prefecture
People from Yokosuka, Kanagawa
Vocaloid voice providers
20th-century Japanese actresses
21st-century Japanese actresses
20th-century Japanese women singers
20th-century Japanese singers
21st-century Japanese women singers
21st-century Japanese singers